Seimata Chilia (born 2 August 1978 in Port Vila) is a Vanuatuan international footballer who plays for Amical as a midfielder.

Career

Club career
Fasavalu began his career in Vanuatu with Tupuji Imere. Also he played in Australia for Fawkner Blues and in Fiji for Suva and in Vanuatu for Yatel. In 2010, he moved to Amical.

International career
Chilia has played at international level for Vanuatu.

References

External links

1978 births
Living people
Suva F.C. players
Vanuatuan footballers
Yatel F.C. players
Vanuatu international footballers
Vanuatuan expatriate footballers
Expatriate footballers in Fiji
Expatriate soccer players in Australia
Vanuatuan expatriate sportspeople in Fiji
Vanuatuan expatriate sportspeople in Australia
2002 OFC Nations Cup players
2004 OFC Nations Cup players
Association football midfielders